Poikilacanthus is a genus of flowering plants in the family Acanthaceae.

It is native to the tropical Americas.

Species
Species include:

References

External links

Acanthaceae
Acanthaceae genera
Flora of Central America
Flora of South America
Flora of Costa Rica